The Barra Honda Formation is a geologic formation in Costa Rica. It preserves fossils dating back to the Paleogene period.

See also 

 List of fossiliferous stratigraphic units in Costa Rica

References

External links 
 

Paleogene Costa Rica
Geologic formations of Costa Rica